Dil Hai Chota Sa is a Pakistani drama television series, weitten by Bushra Ansari, directed by Angeline Malik and developed by Iqbal Ansari for Geo Entertainment. Tooba Siddiqui, Mikaal Zulfiqar and Faysal Quraishi played thd lead roles in the series. It originally aired in 2010.

Plot 
Kehkeshan a.k.a. Kuku hails from a conservative yet prosperous family. She has resided in Pakistan for her entire life. She has been raised to accept that parents generally know best with regards to significant choices throughout everyday life for their children. An active student and a frank debater, Kuku has no say by any means at home and consistently bows her head in regard of her elders' choices. She is then married off with an expatriate Ahmer, and she goes to Spain where he lives.

Cast 
 Tooba Siddiqui
 Mikaal Zulfiqar
 Faysal Quraishi
 Shamoon Abbasi
 Naila Jaffri
 Shabbir Jan
 Shamim Hilaly
 Asif Raza Mir
 Faisal Shah
 Amilia Josephena

Reception 
Dawn listed it among the well-through-out dramas, which dared to be different. A reviewer from Express Tribune praised the series to dealing sensitively with the theme of talaq.

References 

Geo TV original programming
Pakistani drama television series